The 1940 Copa Ibarguren was the 17° edition of this National cup of Argentina. It was played by the champions of both leagues, Primera División and Asociación Rosarina de Fútbol (successor of Liga Rosarina de Football, folded in 1930) crowned during 1940.

Boca Juniors (Primera División champion) faced Rosario Central (Asociación Rosarina champion) at Chacarita Juniors Stadium located in the Villa Crespo district of Buenos Aires. The match was played on January 4, 1941. As the senior squad of Rosario Central was playing the Primera División championships since 1939, the club fielded a reserve team for the occasion.

Qualified teams

Match details

References

i
1940 in Argentine football
1940 in South American football